Zhao of Jin may refer to:

Marquis Zhao of Jin (died 739 BC)
Duke Zhao of Jin (died 526 BC)

See also
Zhao Jin (disambiguation)